The Republican Political Alliance for Integrity and Reform (RePAIR) is a U.S. political group, founded in August 2020, consisting of Republican politicians who oppose the reelection of President Donald Trump. RePAIR is affiliated with Defending Democracy Together. The group's stated mission is to "return to principles-based governing in the post-Trump era," calling for a change in leadership for the Republican party, and supporting the candidacy of Joe Biden in the 2020 U.S. presidential election. The group was founded by former Trump administration official Miles Taylor and is led by former members of Republican administrations, including those of Ronald Reagan, George H. W. Bush, George W. Bush, and Trump.

In 2021, the A Call for American revival movement, which aims to create a new political party as an alternative for the GOP, was formed of members of RePAIR and Stand Up Reoublic.

Notable members

Executive Branch officials
 Richard Armitage, former Deputy Secretary of State
 Stuart M. Gerson, former Acting Attorney General
 James K. Glassman, former Under Secretary of State for Public Diplomacy and Public Affairs
 John Mitnick, former General Counsel, Department of Homeland Security
 Elizabeth Neumann, former Assistant Secretary for Threat Prevention and Security Policy, Department of Homeland Security in the Trump administration
 Anthony Scaramucci, former White House Communications Director in the Trump Administration
 Olivia Troye, former homeland security and counter-terrorism advisor to Vice President Pence and aide to the White House Coronavirus Task Force in the Trump administration
 Miles Taylor, former Chief of Staff, Department of Homeland Security in the Trump Administration

United States Senators
 David Durenberger, former Senator from Minnesota
 Gordon Humphrey, former Senator from New Hampshire

United States House of Representatives
 Steve Bartlett, former Congressman from Texas
 Charlie Dent, former Congressman from Pennsylvania
 Charles Djou, former Congressman from Hawaii
 Mickey Edwards, former Congressman from Oklahoma
 Jim Greenwood, former Congressman from Pennsylvania
 Jim Kolbe, former Congressman from Arizona
 Claudine Schneider, former Congresswoman from Rhode Island
 Peter Plympton Smith, former Congressman from Vermont
 Alan Steelman, former Congressman from Texas
 Jim Walsh, former Congressman from New York
 Dick Zimmer, former Congressman from New Jersey

Political activists
 William Inboden, former Senior Director, National Security Council
 Evan McMullin, former CIA officer
 Tara Setmayer, former Congressional staff member
 Michael Steele, former Chairman, Republican National Committee
 Chris Vance, former Chair, Washington State Republican Party

See also 

 43 Alumni for Biden
 The Lincoln Project

 List of former Trump administration officials who endorsed Joe Biden
 List of Republicans who opposed the 2016 Donald Trump presidential campaign
 List of Republicans who oppose the 2020 Donald Trump presidential campaign
 List of Trump administration appointees who endorsed Joe Biden
 Never Trump movement
 Republican Voters Against Trump
 Right Side PAC

References

External links
 
Never Trump movement